Nicholas Frederick Brady (born April 11, 1930) is an American politician from the state of New Jersey, who was the United States Secretary of the Treasury under Presidents Ronald Reagan and George H. W. Bush, and is also known for articulating the Brady Plan in March 1989. In 1982, he was appointed to succeed Harrison A. Williams as a United States Senator until a special election could be held. He served in the Senate for 8 months.

Early life
Brady was born in Manhattan, New York City, the son of James Cox Brady Jr., and his wife, Eliot Chace. He was named for his paternal great-uncle, businessman and philanthropist Nicholas Frederic Brady. His great-grandfather was industrialist Anthony N. Brady. He grew up on an estate in Far Hills, New Jersey. After graduating from St. Mark's School,
Southborough, Massachusetts, Brady attended Yale University (B.A., 1952), where he was a member of Chi Psi fraternity. He received his M.B.A. from Harvard University in 1954.

Career

Brady's political career began when he was appointed by Governor Thomas Kean as a Republican Senator from New Jersey to fill the vacancy caused by the resignation of Harrison A. Williams. He served from April 12, 1982, through December 27, 1982, and did not seek election to a full term. During his time in the Senate, he was a member of the Armed Services Committee and the Banking, Housing and Urban Affairs Committee.

In 1984, Reagan appointed Brady to be Chairman of the President's Commission on Executive, Legislative and Judicial Salaries. He also served on the President's Commission on Strategic Forces (1983), the National Bipartisan Commission on Central America (1983), the Commission on Security and Economic Assistance (1983), and the Blue Ribbon Commission on Defense Management (1985). He also chaired the Presidential Task Force on Market Mechanisms in 1987.

Brady became the 68th Secretary of the Treasury on September 15, 1988, and served during the last four months of Reagan's presidency and throughout the Bush administration. In 1989, after a period of years in which a number of developing countries, including Mexico, defaulted on their international debt, he developed the Brady Plan to help them sell dollar-denominated bonds. These became known as Brady Bonds.

Early in his tenure as Treasury Secretary, The New York Times wrote that Brady had a rocky start and was "bland on television and awkward as a public speaker." But as a close friend and advisor to President Bush he had considerable influence. Chuck Schumer, a Democratic congressman at the time, expressed the prevailing view: "Is he the smartest guy in the world? No. Did he make some major screwups? Yes. But Brady is one of the few people in the Government trying to do real substance. On savings and loan, he stepped up to the plate and swung at balls. The same with the third world debt. I'm not sure I agree with his plan, but at least he tried to do something. So, in an Administration where so much seems aimed at image and hype, Brady does deserve a lot of credit."

He is a former chairman of the board of Dillon Read & Co. Inc. (investment banking) (1970–1988) and a former Chairman of Purolator, Inc. (filtration products) (1971–1987).

Brady's career in the banking industry spanned 34 years. He joined Dillon, Read & Co. in New York City in 1954, rising to chairman of the board. He has been the Chairman of Darby Overseas Investments, Ltd. and Darby Technology Ventures Group, LLC, investment firms, since 1994. Mr. Brady is Chairman of Franklin Templeton Investment Funds (an international investment management company), a director of Hess Corporation (an exploration and production company) and Holowesko Partners Ltd. (investment management companies). He is also a director of the oilfield services company Weatherford International since 2004.  He has been a director of the NCR Corporation, the MITRE Corporation, and the H.J. Heinz Company, among others. His father had been a major figure in Thoroughbred horse racing both in the United States and in Europe. Although never involved with the sport at the same level as his father, Nicholas Brady served for a time as chairman of The Jockey Club. Mill House (Stable) is the nom de course for Brady's racing operation.

He has also served as a trustee of Rockefeller University and a member of the Board of the Economic Club of New York. He is a member of the Council on Foreign Relations, Inc and a former member of the Steering Committee of the Bilderberg Group. He is a former trustee of the Boys' Club of Newark. Brady received the Golden Plate Award of the American Academy of Achievement in 1977.

Personal life
Brady and his wife, the former Katherine Douglas (known as Kitty), have four children.

References

External links

|-

1930 births
Living people
20th-century American politicians
St. Mark's School (Massachusetts) alumni
Harvard Business School alumni
Politicians from New York City
People from Far Hills, New Jersey
United States Secretaries of the Treasury
Reagan administration cabinet members
Republican Party United States senators from New Jersey
New Jersey Republicans
American financial businesspeople
Yale University alumni
Members of the Steering Committee of the Bilderberg Group
Mitre Corporation people
George H. W. Bush administration cabinet members